Mian Lat (also Romanized as Mīān Lāt) is a village in Sakht Sar Rural District, in the Central District of Ramsar County, Mazandaran Province, Iran. At the 2006 census, its population was 360, in 97 families.

References 

Populated places in Ramsar County